Theodor "Teddy" Kollek (27 May 1911 – 2 January 2007) was an Israeli politician who served as the mayor of Jerusalem from 1965 to 1993, and founder of the Jerusalem Foundation. Kollek was re-elected five times, in 1969, 1973, 1978, 1983, and 1989. After reluctantly running for a seventh term in 1993 at the age of 82, he lost to Likud candidate and future Prime Minister of Israel Ehud Olmert.

During his tenure, Jerusalem developed into a modern city, especially after its reunification in 1967. He was once called "the greatest builder of Jerusalem since Herod."

Early life and marriage
Theodor (Teddy) Kollek was born in Nagy-Vázsony, 120 km from Budapest, Hungary as Kollek Tivadar. His parents, Alfred and Margaret, née Fleischer, named him after Theodor Herzl. The family moved to Vienna in 1918. Growing up in the Austrian capital city, Kollek came to share his father Alfréd's Zionist convictions.

In 1935, three years before the Nazis seized power in Austria, the Kollek family immigrated to British-controlled Mandatory Palestine. In 1937, he was one of the founders of Kibbutz Ein Gev, on the shore of Lake Kinneret. That same year he married Tamar Schwarz. They had two children, a son, the film director Amos Kollek (born in 1947), and a daughter, Osnat.

Intelligence services

The "Hunting Season"
In 1942 Kollek was appointed the Jewish Agency's deputy head of intelligence. Between January 1945 and May 1946 he was the Agency's chief external liaison officer in Jerusalem and was in contact with MI5's main representative as well as members of British Military Intelligence. In the 1940s, on behalf of the Jewish Agency (Sochnut) and as part of the "Hunting Season" or "Saison", Teddy Kollek was the Jewish Agency's contact person with the British Mandate MI5, providing information against right-wing Jewish underground groups Irgun and Lehi (known as "Stern Gang"). He succeeded Reuven Zaslani and preceded Zeev Sherf in this function, and was carrying out the Jewish Agency's policy of assisting the British in fighting these groups. On 10 August 1945 he revealed to MI5 the location of a secret Irgun training camp near Binyamina. Twenty-seven Irgun members were arrested in the raid that followed.

Second World War
During World War II, Kollek tried to represent Jewish interests in Europe on behalf of the Jewish Agency.

Cooperation with the USA
In 1947–48, he represented the Haganah in Washington, where he assisted in acquiring ammunition for Israel's then-fledgling army.

Kollek was a key figure in creating an alliance between the Mossad and the CIA during the 1940s and 1950s.

In national politics
Kollek became a close ally of David Ben-Gurion, serving in the latter's governments from 1952 as the director general of the prime minister's office.

Mayor of Jerusalem

In 1965 Teddy Kollek succeeded Mordechai Ish-Shalom as Mayor of Jerusalem. On his motivations for seeking the mayor's office in Jerusalem, Kollek once recalled:
I got into this by accident[...]  I was bored. When the city was united, I saw this as an historic occasion. To take care of it and show better care than anyone else ever has is a full life purpose. I think Jerusalem is the one essential element in Jewish history. A body can live without an arm or a leg, not without the heart. This is the heart and soul of it.

During his tenure Jerusalem developed into a modern city, especially after its reunification in 1967. He was often called “the greatest builder of Jerusalem since Herod.”

Kollek was re-elected five times, in 1969, 1973, 1978, 1983, and 1989, serving 28 years as mayor of Jerusalem.  In a reluctant seventh bid for mayor in 1993, Kollek, aged 82, lost to Likud candidate Ehud Olmert.

Relationship with the Arab community
In the Six-Day War of 1967, East Jerusalem, which had been under Jordanian control since 1948, was captured by Israel. As mayor of a newly united Jerusalem, Kollek's approach toward the Arab inhabitants was governed by pragmatism. Within hours of the transfer of authority, he arranged for the provision of milk for Arab children. Some Israelis considered him pro-Arab. Kollek advocated religious tolerance and made numerous efforts to reach out to the Arab community during his tenure. Muslims continued to have access to Masjid Al-Aqsa (i.e. the Temple Mount) for worship. While he was adamant that Jerusalem never be divided again and remain under Israeli sovereignty, he believed in concessions to reach a final settlement.

Kollek's views on the annexation of East Jerusalem softened after leaving office.

Civic and cultural projects

Kollek dedicated himself to many cultural projects during his lengthy term in office, and served as the founder and head of the Jerusalem Foundation, through which he helped finance the projects. Kollek was also instrumental in the establishment of the Jerusalem Theater.

The Israel Museum
Kollek's most notable cultural project was the development and expansion of the Israel Museum. From 1965 to 1996, he was president of the museum, and officially designated its founder in 2000. When the museum celebrated its 25th anniversary in 1990, Kollek was named "Avi Ha-muze'on" ("father of the museum").

Through a leadership which spanned decades, Kollek raised millions of dollars from private donors for civic development projects and cultural programs. Kollek once remarked that Israel needed a strong army, but it also needed expressions of culture and civilization.

Jerusalem zoo

Kollek was considered the "number-one friend" of the Jerusalem Biblical Zoo, which occupied a  site in Romema from 1950 to 1991. Though the zoo attracted many visitors to its exhibits of animals, reptiles and birds mentioned in the Bible and was successful in breeding and protecting endangered species, it was considered small and inferior to zoos in Tel Aviv and Haifa. Kollek promoted the idea of moving the zoo to a larger location and upgrading it to a state-of-the-art institution. Around 1990, under the auspices of the Jerusalem Foundation, the Tisch family of New York agreed to underwrite the expensive undertaking. The zoo re-opened as The Tisch Family Zoological Garden in Jerusalem on a  expanse near the neighborhood of Malha in 1993. Kollek helped the zoo raise money to build the elephant enclosure and to bring in female elephants from Thailand at $50,000 apiece. The zoo named its male elephant Teddy and one of its female elephants Tamar in honor of the mayor and his wife.
For Kollek's 90th birthday in 2001, the zoo feted him and the Jerusalem Foundation unveiled a new sculpture garden dedicated in his honor.

Retirement and death
Kollek continued to be active in retirement, maintaining a five-day work week into his nineties, even as he became increasingly infirm. He and his wife lived in their walk-up Rehavia apartment until the mid-1990s, when they moved to Hod Yerushalayim, a retirement home in the Kiryat HaYovel neighborhood.

Kollek died on 2 January 2007. He is buried at the Mount Herzl national cemetery, Jerusalem.

Awards and commemoration
 In 1985, Kollek was awarded the Peace Prize of the German Book Trade.
 In 1988, he was awarded the Israel Prize for his special contribution to society and the State of Israel.
 In 1988, he received the Four Freedoms Award from the Roosevelt Institute for the Freedom of Worship.
 In 1996, Kollek was awarded the Prize of Tolerance of the European Academy of Sciences and Arts.
 In 2001, he was honoured with the title of Honorary Citizen of Vienna.

Teddy Stadium in Malha, Jerusalem, is named for him.
Teddy Fountain in Jerusalem is named for him.

Quotes

"Jerusalem's people of differing faiths, cultures and aspirations must find peaceful ways to live together other than by drawing a line in the sand".

See also
 List of mayors of Jerusalem
 List of Israel Prize recipients
 List of honorary citizens of Vienna

References

Further reading
 Ruth Bachi-Kolodny 2008, "Teddy Kollek. The Man, His Life and His Jerusalem", Gefen Publishing House.

External links

  by Leon Charney on The Leon Charney Report

1911 births
2007 deaths
Mayors of Jerusalem
Jewish mayors
Israel Prize for special contribution to society and the State recipients
Ashkenazi Jews in Mandatory Palestine
Israeli Ashkenazi Jews
Israeli people of Hungarian-Jewish descent
Austrian emigrants to Mandatory Palestine
Austrian Jews
Hungarian Jews
Burials at Mount Herzl
Grand Crosses with Star and Sash of the Order of Merit of the Federal Republic of Germany